Luigi Querena (May 30, 1824 – April 3, 1887) was an Italian painter.

He was born in Venice. Following in the footsteps of his father Lattanzio, a painter of historical and religious works, Luigi enrolled at the Venice Academy of Fine Arts at the age of 12 years. He studied under Federico Moja and distinguished himself as a vedute painter. The contemporary art critic Sagredo said that Luigi was reviving Canaletto.

He took part in the uprising against Austrian rule in 1848, and began painting in 1850 on a series of eight works, arrayed as a Cosmorama, depicting the heroic resistance of Venice against the Austrians.

These were combined also in later years with views of the lagoon and Venetian monuments, sometimes including scenes drawn from literature or contemporary life. A regular participant in the exhibitions of the Venice Academy of Fine Arts, of which he became an honorary member in 1857, he also presented work at the exhibitions of the Brera Academy in Milan, the Società Promotrice di Belle Arti in Genoa and the national exhibitions in Naples (1877), Turin (1880) and Milan (1881).

References

 Laura Casone, Luigi Querena, online catalogue Artgate by Fondazione Cariplo, 2010, CC BY-SA (source for the first revision of this article).

Other projects

1824 births
1887 deaths
19th-century Italian painters
Italian male painters
Painters from Venice
Italian vedutisti
Italian battle painters
Accademia di Belle Arti di Venezia alumni
19th-century Italian male artists